Mount Shimbiris is the highest peak in Somaliland. It is located in the Al Madow mountain range in the Sanaag region.

There is no vehicle access. However, visitors can stay in a tent.

See also

References

External links
 Somalia Country Study

Mount Shimbiris
Mountains of Somaliland
Highest points of countries
Somali montane xeric woodlands